Waltraud Oertel (née Skrzipek on 14 October 1936) is a retired German diver. She competed in the springboard at the 1960 Summer Olympics and finished in 10th place.

Her husband Rudi Oertel competed at the 1960 Olympics in men's springboard. They married around late 1954, when she changed her last name and club. She won four national titles between 1952 and 1955.

References

External links
 

1936 births
Living people
German female divers
Olympic divers of the United Team of Germany
Divers at the 1960 Summer Olympics
Sportspeople from Halle (Saale)
20th-century German women